Below is a list of sovereign states with the dates of their formation (date of their independence or of their constitution), sorted by continent.

This list includes the 195 states which are currently full member states or observer states of the United Nations. This does not include extinct states, but does include several states with limited recognition.

For proposed states or various indigenous nations which consider themselves still under occupation, see list of active autonomist and secessionist movements.

Nation-building is a long evolutionary process, and in most cases the date of a country's "formation" cannot be objectively determined; e.g., the fact that England and France were sovereign kingdoms on equal footing in the medieval period does not prejudice the fact that England is not now a sovereign state (having passed sovereignty to Great Britain in 1707), while France is a Republic founded in 1792 (though the term France generally refers to the current French Fifth Republic government, formed in 1958).

An unambiguous measure is the date of national constitutions; but as constitutions are an almost entirely modern concept, all formation dates by that criterion are modern or early modern (the oldest extant constitution being that of San Marino, dating to 1600).

Independence dates for widely recognized states earlier than 1919 should be treated with caution, since prior to the founding of the League of Nations, there was no international body to recognize nationhood, and independence had no meaning beyond mutual recognition of de facto sovereigns (the role of the League of Nations was effectively taken over by the United Nations after the Second World War). See also: disputed territories.

Many countries have some remote (or fantastically remote) symbolic foundation date as part of their national mythology, sometimes artificially inflating a country's "age" for reasons of nationalism, sometimes merely gesturing at a long and gradual process of the formalizing national identity. Such dates reflect not the formation of a state (an independent political entity), but of a nation (an ethnic or cultural grouping), terms that are often conflated in the context of nation states.

The following list contains the formation dates of countries with a short description of those events. For a more detailed description of a country's formation and history, please see the main article for that country.

Africa

Americas

Asia

 Table notes

Europe

 Table notes

Australia/Oceania

Transcontinental states

Sortable list
In this list, "date of last subordination" refers to the last date of control by an external government. The list shows large groupings associated with the dates of independence from decolonization (e.g. 41 current states gained control of sovereignty from the United Kingdom and France between 1956 and 1966) or dissolution of a political union (e.g. 18 current states gained control of sovereignty from the Soviet Union and Yugoslavia between 1990 and 1992). In other cases, a sovereign state submitted to foreign military occupation or political subjugation for a period of time and later regained its independence (e.g. 6 current states gained control of sovereignty from Nazi Germany between 1944 and 1945).

Dates refer to de facto rule or occupation of the major territory, whether or not legitimized by international recognition.

In a union such as Czechoslovakia, the Soviet Union, or the Kalmar Union, one of the constituents can be considered the dominant power – generally where the seat of government was located. The United Kingdom is a particularly complicated case. If England is viewed as the dominant member, then history can be traced from Roman conquest, Saxon invasions, 10th-century unification, and the 1066 Norman Conquest before the union of England and Scotland in 1707. However, if viewed from a Scottish perspective, an unbroken history of sovereignty can be traced from unification in 843 through the 1707 union with England (with a brief annexation by England from 1657 to 1660). Some Scots view the 1707 union as a ceding of sovereignty to England.

See also 
 Declaration of independence
 List of active autonomist and secessionist movements
 List of national independence days
 List of wars of independence (national liberation)
 List of former European colonies
 List of former national capitals
 List of former sovereign states
List of national constitutions
 List of sovereign states
List of world map changes
Political history of the world
 Succession of states
 Timeline of country and capital changes
Timeline of national independence

Notes

References 

Date of formation
Sovereign states by date of formation